Jealousy is a painting by Norwegian artist Edvard Munch. Munch returned to this image throughout his whole life - he completed no less than 11 painted versions of Jealousy. The first painting was executed in 1895, and the last was made during the 1930s. Munch also created four lithograph versions and one drypoint of Jealousy. 

The painting was made during European period and is based on expressionism style. The 1895 oil on canvas painting, perhaps the most famous version, is now housed at Rasmus Meyer Collection, Bergen and it measures 67 by 100 centimeters. In addition, eight painted versions are possessed by the Munch Museum in Oslo and one version is located at the Städel Museum in Frankfurt am Main (on loan from a private collection). Another version, executed between 1898 and 1900, is called Jealousy in the Bath and was sold at Sotheby's in 1982, but the current location remains unknown.

Gallery

References

1895 paintings
Paintings by Edvard Munch
Paintings in Bergen
Paintings in the collection of the Städel
Paintings in the collection of the Munch Museum